Athletics events were contested at the 1973 Summer Universiade in Moscow, Soviet Union, between 16 and 20 August.

Medal summary

Men's events

Women's events

Medal table

References
World Student Games (Universiade - Men) - GBR Athletics
World Student Games (Universiade - Women) - GBR Athletics

 
Athletics at the Summer Universiade
Uni
1973 Summer Universiade
International athletics competitions hosted by the Soviet Union
1973 Universiade